Ľubica Novotníková-Kurhajcová (born 13 June 1964) is a Slovak rower. She competed at the 1988 Summer Olympics and the 1992 Summer Olympics.

References

External links
 

1954 births
Living people
Slovak female rowers
Olympic rowers of Czechoslovakia
Rowers at the 1988 Summer Olympics
Rowers at the 1992 Summer Olympics
Sportspeople from Bratislava